Giscard El Khoury is a Lebanese diplomat currently serving as Ambassador Extraordinary and Plenipotentiary to Kazakhstan.

Career 
Khoury was appointed Lebanon ambassador to Kazakhstan in May 2018. He presented his letter of credence to Kazakhstan president Nursultan Nazarbayev on 22 August 2018.

References 

Lebanese diplomats
Year of birth missing (living people)
Living people
Ambassadors of Lebanon